Hasmukh is an Indian dark comedy streaming television series directed by Nikhil Gonsalves. Co-created and written by Nikkhil Advani and Vir Das, the series stars Das, Ranvir Shorey,Inaamulhaq, Amrita Bagchi, Ravi Kishan, and Manoj Pahwa. The story follows a small-town comedian who becomes a serial killer. Hasmukh premiered on Netflix on 17 April 2020.

Cast 
 Vir Das as Hasmukh
 Ranvir Shorey as Jimmy
 Amrita Bagchi as Promila
 Deeksha Sonalkar as Rhea
 Ravi Kishan as Mr. Sinha
 Manoj Pahwa as Gulati
 Raza Murad as Jameel Indori
 Suhail Nayyar as KK

Episodes

References

External links 
 

Indian television series distributed by Netflix
2020 Indian television series debuts
Hindi-language Netflix original programming